The Alliance for Work, Justice and Education (in Spanish: Alianza para el Trabajo, la Justicia y la Educación), also known as Alliance (in Spanish: Alianza) was a centre-right political coalition in Argentina around the turn of the third millennium. It was born of the alliance of the Radical Civic Union, the Front for a Country in Solidarity and a number of smaller provincial parties in 1997. In aftermath of the December 2001 riots, the Alliance soon disintegrated, its members returning to their former parties or finding new ones.

History

The Alliance presented itself as a progressive, moderate centre-left alternative to the neoliberal government of Carlos Menem, with a mandate to end corruption and unemployment. In the 1995 elections, the-then President Carlos Menem was re-elected, reaching 49% of the vote. The opposition had presented itself divided into two great forces, the Front for a Country in Solidarity, an alliance of parties that obtained 29% of the votes, and the Radical Civic Union that obtained 17%. It was evident that together, both forces obtained an adhesion similar to that of the Justicialist Party. The coalition first took part in the 1997 legislative elections in which they emerged victorious against the ruling Justicialist Party. In the 1999 general elections it took Fernando de la Rúa (UCR) to the presidency, together with Carlos Álvarez (FG/FREPASO) as his vice president, defeating, Buenos Aires Governor and former Vice President under Menem Eduardo Duhalde of the Justicialist Party.

However, De la Rúa soon revealed himself as unable or unwilling to tackle corruption and to revive the Argentine economy, which was in a recession, with innovative measures. In 2000, amid a scandal caused by accusations of bribery involving UCR senators and members of the cabinet, Álvarez resigned from the vice presidency, gravely hurting the unity of the Alliance. In the 2001 legislative elections, the Alliance suffered a large defeat winning only 35 seats of the 127 contested seats in the Chamber of Deputies an only 26 seats out of 70 in the Senate The socio-economic situation worsened, and De la Rúa was forced to resign by the December 2001 riots. The Alliance soon disintegrated, its members returning to their former parties or finding new ones.

References

See also
Politics of Argentina
December 2001 riots in Argentina

Radical Civic Union
Presidency of Fernando de la Rúa
Defunct political party alliances in Argentina
Political parties established in 1997
1997 establishments in Argentina
Political parties disestablished in 2001
2001 disestablishments in Argentina